Alaiye is the medieval Seljuq name for Alanya (on the southern coast of Turkey). It refers to the city-state in a specific period and the beylik which developed around there, at times under the Karamanid dynasty. After the 1242 Battle of Köse Dağ, the Seljuqs lost control of the city, and it became semi-autonomous.

Occupations
Before the influence of the Karamanid dynasty, Henry II of Jerusalem made an unsuccessful attempt to invade the city in 1291. Karamanids influence then began in 1293, with the capture of the beylik by Majd ad-Din Mahmud. In 1427, the Mamluk Sultan Al-Ashraf Sayf Addin Barsbay acquired the beylik from the Karamanid Sultan Damad II İbrahim Bey in exchange of 5,000 gold coins. In 1366, an attempt to occupy the beylik by Peter I of Cyprus was unsuccessful.

Governance
The beylik existed as an independent principality in some form from 1293 until 1471. The second rule of Kayqubad III was centered there. The Ottoman general Gedik Ahmed Pasha's victory against Kasim Bey and the Karamanids also happened in Alaiye.  During this period no major state existed in Anatolia, following the defeat of the Seljuq Sultanate of Rûm by the Mongol Empire at the Battle of Köse Dag.

Following minor Christian incursions in the region in 1371, Badr ad-Din Mahmud Bey, an emir of the Karamanids built a mosque and medrese in 1373–1374 in the city.

Ruler list
 Mecdüddin Mahmud (1293-?)
 Yusuf (1330-1337)
 Şemseddin Mehmed (1337-1352)
 Hüsameddin Mahmud
 Savcı Bey ( - 1423) 
 Karaman Bey
 Lütfi ( - 1455)
 Kılıç Arslan (1455 - 1471)

References

Further reading

(Turkish) Alâiye Beyligi

Anatolian beyliks
History of Alanya
States in medieval Anatolia
States and territories established in 1293
History of Antalya Province
1293 establishments in Asia